Blatno is a municipality and village in Chomutov District in the Ústí nad Labem Region of the Czech Republic. It has about 600 inhabitants.

Administrative parts
Villages of Bečov, Hrádečná, Květnov, Mezihoří, Radenov, Šerchov and Zákoutí are administrative parts of Blatno.

Gallery

References

Villages in Chomutov District
Villages in the Ore Mountains